Baron Mihály Mérey de Kaposmére (Mérei; 1500 – 26 February 1572) was a Hungarian jurist and noble, who served as Palatinal Governor in the Kingdom of Hungary, between 1562 and 1572.

Biography
He studied law in the court of Elek Thurzó, the Royal Governor of Hungary. Mérey became a member of the Vice-regency Council in 1542. He was appointed Chief Justice by Ferdinand I in 1544. He held that office until 1562, when he was elected Palatinal Governor (or Vice-palatine), after the death of Tamás Nádasdy. The office had only jurisdictional function, as the Hungarian magnates demanded restoring the office of the Palatine. The Emperor-King reigned Hungary over the Royal Governor.

Mérey was created Baron in 1563. He also functioned as Ispán (Count; comes) of Pest-Pilis-Solt-Kiskun County. During his tenure, he received substantial estate donations: he acquired, among others, Éberhárd Castle (today: Malinovo, Slovakia), and the large areas of Somogy and Trencsén Counties.

He participated in the development of the Quadripartium, which would have been the Corpus Juris of Hungary, however never became law. Mérey died in 1572. He was succeeded by Imre Czobor.

References

Sources
 Markó, László: A magyar állam főméltóságai Szent Istvántól napjainkig – Életrajzi Lexikon p. 240. (The High Officers of the Hungarian State from Saint Stephen to the Present Days – A Biographical Encyclopedia) (2nd edition); Helikon Kiadó Kft., 2006, Budapest; .
 Bokor, József (ed.) Négyes könyv, A Pallas nagy lexikona. Arcanum, FolioNET Kft, 1998. .

1500 births
1572 deaths
Hungarian nobility
Hungarian jurists
Chief justices of Hungary